These are the results of the diving competition at the 1978 World Aquatics Championships, which took place in West Berlin.

Medal table

Medal summary

Men

Women

1978 World Aquatics Championships
Diving at the World Aquatics Championships
1978 in diving